Quentin Caleyron (born 30 January 1988) is a French racing cyclist who represents France in BMX and track cycling. He represented France at the 2012 Summer Olympics in the men's BMX event, finishing 12th.

He turned to track cycling in 2018 and disputed his first World cup in Berlin at the end of 2018.

References

External links
 
 
 
 
 

1988 births
Living people
BMX riders
French male cyclists
French track cyclists
Olympic cyclists of France
Cyclists at the 2012 Summer Olympics
European Games medalists in cycling
European Games silver medalists for France
Cyclists at the 2019 European Games
Cyclists from Auvergne-Rhône-Alpes
Sportspeople from Saint-Étienne
21st-century French people